Mexenone (Uvistat, benzophenone-10) is a benzophenone-derived sunscreening agent.

See also
 Benzophenone-n

Benzophenones
Sunscreening agents
Phenol ethers
Phenols